Valentine John Bettin (July 8, 1923 – January 7, 2021) was an American actor, known for using an English accent in all of his roles. He is perhaps best known for voicing Dr. David Q. Dawson in the 1986 Disney animated film The Great Mouse Detective and the Sultan in The Return of Jafar and Aladdin and the King of Thieves, the two direct-to-video sequels to Disney's Aladdin as well as the TV show, taking over for Douglas Seale. Bettin also hosted The Storyteller, a children's show on Chicago television in the late 1950s.

Early life and career
He was born in La Crosse, Wisconsin on July 8, 1923. In 1948, he went to England to enroll in the Royal Academy of Dramatic Arts and graduated in 1950. There he met his wife Hildy in 1950, and the two married that same year. They returned to the United States in order for him to become a drama teacher in Iowa.

Bettin's first film role was in 1980's Somewhere in Time. He later became a voice actor, with his first role as Dr. David Q. Dawson in the 1986 Disney film The Great Mouse Detective. His credits included Shrek, Gargoyles, Mighty Ducks: The Animated Series and W.I.T.C.H..

Personal life
He married Hildy Pender, from Manchester, England, in 1950. She died in Ventura, California on August 16, 2007, at the age of 82.

Bettin died of natural causes in Ventura on January 7, 2021, at the age of 97. He was buried at Ivy Lawn Memorial Park on 3 March.

Filmography

Film

Television

Video games

Audiobooks
Quest for Camelot Audio Action-Adventure (1998) - Narrator

References

External links

Val Bettin at the Great Mouse Detective fansite

1923 births
2021 deaths
20th-century American male actors
21st-century American male actors
Alumni of RADA
American male film actors
American male radio actors
American male stage actors
American male television actors
American male voice actors
Male actors from Wisconsin
People from La Crosse, Wisconsin